WNND (formerly WSWZ) and WNNP are two FM radio stations serving the Columbus, Ohio market. Owned by the Columbus Radio Group subsidiary of Saga Communications, WNND broadcasts on 103.5 MHz from Pickerington, Ohio, and WNNP broadcasts on 104.3 MHz from Richwood, Ohio.  Its studios are located in Upper Arlington.

Prior to joining in a simulcast, WNND formerly carried a Smooth AC format "Smooth Jazz 103.5" under the WJZA calls with programming derived from Broadcast Architecture's Smooth Jazz Network, while from 2009 to 2010, WNNP had its own identity as WODB, "Big Hits B104.3," with a classic hits format.

At 4:35 p.m. on July 30, 2010, after a brief stunt airing songs with an "end" theme, WJZA and WODB became "Rewind 103.5/104.3: Columbus' Greatest Hits," and adopted a 1980s-based classic hits format. The first song on "Rewind" was "Let's Groove" by Earth, Wind & Fire. On August 6, 2010, WJZA and WODB changed their call letters to WNND and WNNP, respectively.

WNND broadcasts in the HD Radio format.

History
WNND and WNNP are now one of two radio stations in the Columbus market to have a Classic Hits format, joining Newark-based WNKO.  They also feature the second 1980s-derived classic hits format in Columbus radio history, as sister station WVMX was all-1980s WXST ("Star 107.9") back in the late 1990s.

WSWZ (FM), later WJZA (103.5 FM)

On 103.5 MHz, WSWZ (FM) signed on the air at 6 AM on October 7, 1989 with 6 kilowatts from a non-directional antenna on Tower Hill north of Lancaster that also reached into nearby Columbus, more than 30 miles distant.  "Z-103" programmed an oldies format to Lancaster and Columbus that ultimately proved so popular that two more powerful FM stations in Ohio's capital city also switched to an oldies format. Along with the oldies format, WSWZ-FM also programmed local newscasts twice an hour in the mornings, and twice an hour in the afternoons. In its later years, the station received most of its oldies from a satellite playlist service, but kept 8 hours of local programming along with news inserts during morning and afternoon drive times.

New owners changed the call letters of WSWZ to WJZA on February 13, 1998, and switched the format to smooth jazz, taking the format previously aired on 107.5 in Columbus. That station dropped the WJZA calls and smooth jazz format on December 26, 1997 in exchange for WCKX's calls and format, which were dropped from 106.3 FM (now known as WHTD).

In time, the usage of the "smooth jazz" name was taken very liberally as WJZA shifted to a hybrid of Adult Contemporary, Urban AC, and instrumental covers, while the majority of WJZA's programming was soon derived from Broadcast Architecture's "Your Smooth Jazz" service, which chiefly operated under this hybrid style.  The jazz and smooth jazz formats proved sustainable, but not as popular as the original oldies format on WSWZ.

WNNP (104.3 FM)
WNNP began broadcasting in 1995 as WZJZ with a jazz format. In 1999, WZJZ switched to a simulcast of WJZA's smooth jazz programming under the WJZK call letters. Their classic hits format, known as "Big Hits B104.3", launched on February 2, 2009 at 12:00PM, taken from the former "Big Hits B107.9" WODB at 107.9, which a few days earlier, switched to a Hot AC format as WVMX, "Mix 107.9." Morning host Dave Kay was the only local personality on the station, with the rest of the programming having been satellite-fed from Dial Global (but under a different channel than the one WTDA carried).

Due to WNNP's transmitter originating 40 miles northwest from Columbus in Richwood, the 104.3 signal suffers coverage problems in the Columbus metro, mainly in the eastern and southern portions. While still WODB, the station filed an application to change its city of license and transmitter location from Richwood to West Jefferson, Ohio, along with increasing power from 3.4 KW to 6 KW, so as to offer better coverage in the Columbus area. The move ultimately was rejected by the FCC.

A Letter from WJZA's Columbusjazz.com as of July 30, 2010

References

External links
Rewind 103.5/104.3

NND
Radio stations established in 1989
1989 establishments in Ohio